The 2014–15 Creighton Bluejays women's basketball team represented Creighton University in the 2014–15 college basketball season. The Bluejays were led by 12th year head coach Jim Flanery and were members of the Big East Conference. The Bluejays play their home games at the D. J. Sokol Arena. They finished the season 17–14, 10–8 in Big East play to finish in a tie fifth place. They lost in the quarterfinals of the Big East women's tournament to St. John's. They were invited to the Women's National Invitation Tournament where they lost to South Dakota in the first round.

Roster

Schedule

|-
!colspan=9 style="background:#000066; color:white;"|Exhibition

|-
!colspan=9 style="background:white; color:#000066;"| Regular Season

|-
!colspan=9 style="background:#000066;"| 2015 Big East tournament

|-
!colspan=9 style="background:#000066;"| WNIT

See also
 2014–15 Creighton Bluejays men's basketball team

References

Creighton
Creighton Bluejays women's basketball seasons
2015 Women's National Invitation Tournament participants
Creighton Bluejays
Creighton Bluejays